The LNB Pro B, commonly known as Pro B, is the 2nd-tier level men's professional basketball league in France. It is the second division of the Ligue Nationale de Basket (LNB), which has organized the league since the year 1987. The regular season champion and the winner of the promotion playoffs from each Pro B season are promoted to the top-tier level LNB Pro A, replaced by the bottom two teams in Pro A. The two last placed teams are relegated to the third level, which is the NM1.

History

Names of the league

Format
All eighteen competing teams play each other twice during the regular season. The team that ends in first place in the table is named league champion and promotes to the LNB Pro A. The top eight regular season teams, with exception for the league champion, qualify for the promotion playoffs. During the competition, the Leaders Cup tournament is played. The champion of the Leaders Cup automatically qualifies for the playoffs. The winner of the promotion playoffs, which is played with best-of-three playoff series, promotes to the ProA. The bottom two regular season teams are meanwhile relegated to the third tier Nationale Masculine 1 (NM1) league.

Current teams
These are the current teams:

Champions

1932–1987

1988–present

Logos

Awards

LNB Pro B Best Coach and Most Improved Player

See also
 LNB Pro B Leaders Cup
 List of basketball clubs in France

References

External links
Official Site 
Eurobasket.com - France

 
2
Second level basketball leagues in Europe
Professional sports leagues in France